USC&GS Patton (ASV-80) was a survey ship that served in the United States Coast and Geodetic Survey from 1941 to 1967.

Patton was designed for the Coast and Geodetic Survey by H. C. Hanson of Seattle who had also designed sister ship E. Lester Jones. The design became a standard for other agency vessels of the size and type. The ship was built by Silvert Sagstad in 1941 at Sagstad Shipyards, Seattle at a cost of $150,000. The vessel was wooden construction,  in length, a  beam and  draft. Hull construction was of heavy and divided by four watertight bulkheads. Patton was powered by twin six cylinder, 150 horsepower, Cooper-Bessemer diesel engines driving twin  propellers. Electrical power was by means of two 14 horsepower generating sets. A boiler provided heat for radiators. Survey equipment included a Fathometer with special generator wiring and switchboard.

Crew quarters were forward with wardroom aft. Galley, mess room, washrooms and other accommodations were in the deck house.

She served in the Pacific during her Survey career, including in Alaskan waters. Patton was retired in 1967 and sold. The ship became the private yacht St Croix then sold as Triton and later renamed Gyrfalcon. She is based in the Seattle, Washington, area.

References

External links
 The Coast and Geodetic Survey Ship PATTON at Seattle.
 Lieutenant Commander Bruce William, commanding officer of the USC&GS;PATTON, checking fathometer as compared to leadline.
 Crew of the USC&GS; Ship PATTON during 1945 field season. Robert A. Studds, Cmdg. Identification of individuals on photo.
 USC&GSS Lester Jones (ASV-79), inboard of USC&GS Patton (AVS-80), and at rear Hodgson NOAA photo
 TRITON - IMO 7732406
 Welcome to the Gyrfalcon (Interior/exterior photos)

Ships of the United States Coast and Geodetic Survey
Survey ships of the United States
Ships built in Seattle
1941 ships
Individual yachts